Art Link is an American football coach. He is currently the special teams coordinator at Delaware. He previously served as the head football coach at Christopher Newport University in Newport News, Virginia from 2017 to 2021, compiling a record of 19–22. Prior to coming to Christopher Newport, Link was a defensive coordinator at Lafayette College in Easton, Pennsylvania from 2014 to 2016.

As a college player at the University of Florida, Link was a linebacker on Florida's 1996 national championship team .

Head coaching record

References

External links
 Christopher Newport profile
 Lafayette profile

Year of birth missing (living people)
Living people
American football linebackers
Campbell Fighting Camels football coaches
Catholic University Cardinals football coaches
Christopher Newport Captains football coaches
Delaware Fightin' Blue Hens football coaches
Florida Gators football coaches
Florida Gators football players
Lafayette Leopards football coaches
Missouri Western Griffons football coaches
New Hampshire Wildcats football coaches
High school football coaches in Florida